In ancient Greece, a hecatomb (hekatómbē) was a sacrifice of 100 cattle (hekaton = one hundred, bous = bull) to the Greek gods. In practice, as few as 12 could make up a hecatomb.

Although originally the sacrifice of a hundred oxen in the religious ceremonies of the Greeks and Romans; later "hecatomb" came to describe a large number of any kind of animals devoted for sacrifice. Figuratively, "hecatomb" is used to describe the sacrifice or destruction by fire, tempest, disease or the sword of any large number of persons or animals; and also of the wholesale destruction of inanimate objects, and even of mental and moral attributes.

Ancient Greece
Hecatombs were offered to Greek gods Hera, Athena, and Apollo during special religious ceremonies. At the end of the Olympic Games, a hecatomb was also offered to Zeus at Olympia.

In the Iliad hecatombs are described formulaically.  The following is one instance, from Samuel Butler's translation:

See also
 Fire worship

References

External links 
 

Animal festival or ritual
Greek animal sacrifice
Greek words and phrases